Nevado de Famatina (also called Manuel Belgrano) is a peak in Argentina with an elevation of  metres. It is the highest point of Sierra de Famatina. It is located within the territory of the Argentinean province of La Rioja. Its slopes are within the administrative boundaries of the Argentinean cities: Famatina and Chilecito.

First ascent 
The first recorded ascent of Famatina was by Rudolf Hauthal (Germany) on 20 May 1895.

Elevation 
Other data from available digital elevation models: SRTM yields 6094 metres, ALOS 6066 metres and TanDEM-X 6124 metres. The height of the nearest key col is 3332 meters, leading to a topographic prominence of 2783 meters. Its topographic dominance is 45.51%, parent peak is Ojos del Salado and the Topographic isolation is 223.1 kilometers.

References

External links 

 Elevation information about Famatina
 Weather Forecast at Famatina

Mountains of La Rioja Province, Argentina
Six-thousanders of the Andes
Mountains of Argentina
Sierras Pampeanas